Konjsko is a South Slavic placename, derived from konj ("horse"). It may refer to:

Konjsko, Karlobag, Croatia
Konjsko, Klis, Croatia
Konjsko, Lipljan, Kosovo
Konjsko, Posušje, Bosnia
Konjsko, Resen, North Macedonia
Konjsko, Trebinje, Bosnia
Konjsko Brdo, Perušić, Croatia

Serbo-Croatian place names